Letter to Brezhnev is a 1985 British romantic comedy film about working-class life in Liverpool, written by Frank Clarke and directed by Chris Bernard. It starred Alexandra Pigg, Margi Clarke, Alfred Molina, Peter Firth and Tracy Marshak-Nash (credited as Tracy Lea). Letter to Brezhnev presents Margaret Thatcher's high-unemployment Liverpool as a depressed and tough city fallen on hard times.

Plot and themes
Two young women from Kirkby, a rough suburb of Liverpool, Teresa and Elaine, meet two Russian sailors, Sergei and Peter, and hook up for a night of fun and frolics. Teresa is looking for sex and a smile, Elaine wants love, romance and the dream of a life far away from the grime of Liverpool.

Amongst other themes, it reflects the constraints on working class women's dreams. It also shows that many people do not get the chance to aspire to anything other than the humdrum lives they find before them as they walk away from school. Some of the characters worked in what they called "the chicken factory", a slaughterhouse. It also reflects hope and ambition as despite awful odds, the protagonists pursue their dreams.

Cast
 Alexandra Pigg – Elaine
 Margi Clarke – Teresa
 Peter Firth – Peter
 Alfred Molina – Sergei
 Tracy Lea – Tracy
 Iggy Navarro – President of Soviet Union
 Ken Campbell – Newspaper reporter
 Angela Clarke – Josie (Elaine's sister)
 Ted Wood – Mick
 Sharon Power – Charlie's Girl

Production
The film was shot in three weeks on a small budget with fees deferred to those involved. Scenes were filmed in the State Nightclub, a prominent Liverpool venue in the 1980s.  It assisted Liverpool in becoming the second most filmed city in the UK after London. For the soundtrack, Sandie Shaw re-recorded the song "Always Something There to Remind Me", and Bronski Beat's "Hit That Perfect Beat" was also used.

Reception
Los Angeles Times critic Kevin Thomas described Letter to Brezhnev as "a winner, [and] further evidence of the enduring renewal of the British film industry". Walter Goodman of The New York Times wrote: "The zesty script by Frank Clarke is at once shamelessly romantic ("You look to the star and think of me") and unromantically streetwise ("Talk about Russian hands and roamin' fingers")." Roger Ebert of the Chicago Sun-Times concluded:Letter to Brezhnev is strong because it is simple. It is not really about romance at all. It is about how idealism can be a way of escaping from the rat race. It is about a young woman with the courage to try something dramatic to break out of the trap she's in. It is also about a brave new tradition in British filmmaking, in which the heroes are ordinary people, seen with love.Kate Muir, writing for The Times in 2017, said the film "creaks a little with age and its crew of young actors sometimes seems stagey. Yet it has ebullient energy". The reviewer for the BFI's Screenonline website described it as having "done more than perhaps any other film before or since in putting Liverpool on the cinematic map".

The film opened at the top of the UK box office where it remained for two weeks.

References

External links
 

1985 films
1985 romantic comedy films
British romantic comedy films
Cold War films
Social realism in film
Films set in Liverpool
Cultural depictions of Leonid Brezhnev
1980s English-language films
1980s British films